The British Drift Championship was a drifting series held in the UK.

The series began in 2008  as a feeder series to the European Drift Championship. However, the partnership between the BDC and EDC organisers ended at the end of the season and the BDC became a professional series in its own right.

The series originally had two classes, Semi-Pro and Pro. However, due to the vast growth of the championship a third class was added for the 2011 season, called 'Super Pro' which became the highest class. The top drivers in the Pro class were merged into this new class.

For the 2015 season the championship reverted to two classes; the three classes from 2014 were merged to create the Pro-Am and Pro class. A feeder series called Drift Cup was created to allow those wishing to take part in the series the chance to prove they have what it takes to drive in the main championship.

In 2016, the series was taken over by the owner of the Irish Drift Championship, David Egan. Following the conclusion of the 2018 season, it was announced that Egan would be stepping down from his position, to be replaced by Matt Stevenson, a BDC Pro driver and 2014 Semi-Pro champion.

Stevenson sold the championship to his understudy Frost at the end of 2020 after failing to make it a success.

At the end of the 2022 season, following a string of catastrophic decisions from Stevenson and Frost, the championship folded. 

.   .

Champions
Pro-Am Class (previously Semi-Pro)

Pro Class

Super Pro Class (merged into Pro from 2015)

References 

Drifting series
Drift
2008 establishments in the United Kingdom
Recurring sporting events established in 2008
National championships in the United Kingdom